Cynosarges ( Kynosarges) was a famous temple of Heracles, public gymnasium, and surrounding grove located just outside the walls of Ancient Athens on the southern bank of the Ilissos river and near the Diomeian gate. The modern suburb of Kynosargous is named after it.

Overview
Its exact location is unknown but it is generally located in what is now the southern suburbs of Athens.

Its name was a mystery to the ancients that was explained by a story about a white or swift dog, etymologising the name as Kynos argos, from genitive of kyon (dog) and argos (white, shining, or swift). The legend goes that on one occasion when Didymos, an Athenian, was performing a lavish sacrifice, a white (or swift) dog appeared and snatched the offering; Didymos was alarmed, but received an oracular message saying that he should establish a temple to Heracles in the place where the dog dropped the offering.

Herodotus mentions a shrine there in 490/89 BC, and it became a famous sanctuary of Heracles that was also associated with his mother Alcmene, his wife Hebe and his nephew/helper Iolaus. It appeared that Heracles and Hebe each had a dedicated altar whereas Alcmene and Iolaus shared one. A renowned gymnasium was built there; it was meant especially for nothoi, illegitimate children. The Cynosarges was also where the Cynic Antisthenes was said to have lectured, a fact which was offered as one explanation as to how the sect got the name of Cynics.

A festival was held at Cynosarges in honour of Heracles in the month of Metageitnion, at which twelve nothoi were chosen to be parasitoi (fellow diners), who ate a meal with the cult statue of the god. They returned for smaller meals each month for a year where a priest would perform sacrifices. People who refused to serve as parasitoi were liable to be prosecuted in the Athenian court system. Clement recorded that Philip II of Macedon, who claimed Heracles as an ancestor, was honoured with a cult at the site.

Archaeological excavations were carried out in 1896-7 by Campbell Cowan Edgar, then a student at the British School at Athens.

See also
 Athenian festivals

Notes

References 

 Athenaeus of Naucratis, The Deipnosophists or Banquet of the Learned. London. Henry G. Bohn, York Street, Covent Garden. 1854. Online version at the Perseus Digital Library.
 Athenaeus of Naucratis, Deipnosophistae. Kaibel. In Aedibus B.G. Teubneri. Lipsiae. 1887. Greek text available at the Perseus Digital Library.
 Herodotus, The Histories with an English translation by A. D. Godley. Cambridge. Harvard University Press. 1920. . Online version at the Topos Text Project. Greek text available at Perseus Digital Library.
 Pausanias, Description of Greece with an English Translation by W.H.S. Jones, Litt.D., and H.A. Ormerod, M.A., in 4 Volumes. Cambridge, MA, Harvard University Press; London, William Heinemann Ltd. 1918. . Online version at the Perseus Digital Library
 Pausanias, Graeciae Descriptio. 3 vols. Leipzig, Teubner. 1903.  Greek text available at the Perseus Digital Library.
 Suida, Suda Encyclopedia translated by Ross Scaife, David Whitehead, William Hutton, Catharine Roth, Jennifer Benedict, Gregory Hays, Malcolm Heath Sean M. Redmond, Nicholas Fincher, Patrick Rourke, Elizabeth Vandiver, Raphael Finkel, Frederick Williams, Carl Widstrand, Robert Dyer, Joseph L. Rife, Oliver Phillips and many others. Online version at the Topos Text Project.

External links 

Ancient Greek buildings and structures in Athens
Ancient Greek religion
Cynicism
Former buildings and structures in Greece
Heracles
Gymnasiums (ancient Greece)
Festivals in ancient Athens